Mark Warner (born February 24, 1954)  is an American film editor who was nominated at the 1989 Academy Awards for Best Film Editing for the film Driving Miss Daisy. He has done over 30 films since 1978. In addition, he was nominated for an Emmy with Edward Warschilka for And Starring Pancho Villa as Himself in the category Outstanding Single-Camera Picture Editing for a Miniseries, Movie or a Special. He often works with director Bruce Beresford (see List of film director and editor collaborations).

Filmography

Tiger (2018) (also editorial consultant)
The Comedian (2016)
Parker (2013)
Goddess (2013)
Careless Love (2012)
Sanctum (2011)
Matching Jack (2010)
Accidents Happen (2009) (additional editor) 
Mao's Last Dancer (2009)
The Water Horse: Legend of the Deep (2007)
The Contract (2006)
Like Minds (2006)
Anacondas: The Hunt for the Blood Orchid (2004) (additional editor)
And Starring Pancho Villa as Himself (2003) (TV movie)
Abandon (2002)
Lara Croft: Tomb Raider (2001)
Monkeybone (2001)
Proof of Life (2000) (post production editor)
Double Jeopardy (1999)
Thicker Than Blood (1998) (TV movie)
The Devil's Advocate (1997)
The Chamber (1996)
A Family Thing (1996)
Dolores Claiborne (1995)
Intersection (1994)
Rich in Love (1992)
Leap of Faith (1992)
Rush (1991)
Pacific Heights (1990)
Driving Miss Daisy (1989)
Cocoon: The Return (1988) (Credited as Mark Roy Warner)
The Running Man (1987) (Credited as Mark Roy Warner) 
Big Trouble in Little China (1986)
Weird Science (1985)
A Soldier's Story (1984)
Staying Alive (1983)
48 Hrs. (1982)
Rocky III (1982)
Raging Bull (1980) (associate editor) 
Being There (1979) (assistant editor) 
Coming Home (1978) (assistant editor)

References

External links
 

American film editors
Living people
1954 births